Christian Mauricio Sepúlveda Morris (born 19 October 1992) is a Chilean footballer who last played for Deportes Recoleta in the Chilean Segunda División.

International career
He was part of the Chilean national youth team which reached the 2007 FIFA U-20 World Cup third place at Canada.

Honours

International
FIFA U-20 World Cup: Third place 2007

References

External links
 

1987 births
Living people
People from Santiago
People from Santiago Province, Chile
People from Santiago Metropolitan Region
Footballers from Santiago
Chilean footballers
Chile youth international footballers
Chile under-20 international footballers
Unión Española footballers
Deportes Iquique footballers
Deportes Melipilla footballers
Ñublense footballers
Santiago Wanderers footballers
Unión San Felipe footballers
Deportes Magallanes footballers
Magallanes footballers
Santiago Morning footballers
Deportes Recoleta footballers
Chilean Primera División players
Primera B de Chile players
Segunda División Profesional de Chile players
Association football midfielders